Meadow Lea is one of Australia's leading brands of polyunsaturated margarine spreads, founded in Sydney by 1932 and owned since 1986 by the Australasian food company Goodman Fielder. It has been the top-selling margarine brand since 1973 and was the second polyunsaturated margarine in Australia; the first was Miracle by Marrickville Holdings (now owned by Unilever).

History
The Meadow Lea brand was founded by Oliver Triggs in 1932, in Enmore, Sydney, but had its origins about four years earlier in Richmond, Melbourne, where Triggs owned a small grocery store. In about 1934 Triggs hired James (Jim) Armstrong as a sales manager, on commission, for country regions in New South Wales. In 1941 Triggs and Armstrong reached an agreement whereby Armstrong would sell his roughly 25% sales commission share in the Meadow Lea Margarine Company to Triggs' son Kenneth (Ken) when he turned 21 in 1945.

Accordingly, Armstrong sold his commission interests in Meadow Lea to Ken Triggs in 1945, and retired from the company. In about 1956, Oliver and Ken Triggs sold the Meadow Lea Margarine Company to Vegetable Oils Proprietary Limited, a subsidiary of the publicly listed company Allied Mills Limited.

On 30 April 1986 Allied Mills was taken over by Fielder Gillespie Davis Limited, part of the Goodman Group Limited (New Zealand), to create Goodman Fielder Limited. In 1987 Goodman Fielder purchased Wattie Industries Ltd (New Zealand), becoming Goodman Fielder Wattie Limited, only to divest Wattie Foods to H. J. Heinz Company in 1992 and return to being called Goodman Fielder Limited. In 2003 Goodman Fielder was acquired by Burns, Philp & Company Limited, being relisted again in 2005.

Products
In 2010 the MeadowLea product range consisted of six varieties:
 Original
 Salt Reduced
 Canola
 Light
 Extra Light
 Dairy Free

Oliver Triggs
Oliver Francis Triggs (1895–1962) founded the Meadow Lea table margarine brand by 1932 and was the first person in Australia to manufacture table margarine, finally selling Meadow Lea to Allied Mills in about 1956. Triggs was born in Melbourne on a small farm, fought with the Light Horse in World War I, then trained as a tailor, before opening a corner grocery shop and making copha butter. After copha butter was banned in Victoria to support the butter industry and pure butter sales, Triggs moved to Sydney in about 1931. He was married to Nita Alice Bek (1895–1974) and had four children, Kenneth, Audray and Marian (twins), and Jill.

From about 1935 until 1975, the family home was Edgewater, 3 Sutherland Crescent, Darling Point,  bought from the Wirth Brothers Circus family for £30,000, which was then-called Margworth. Its water front gardens (including a tennis court and swimming pool) were sold to the neighbouring Carthona in the 1950s, when Edgewater was divided into three homes (one on each floor) with Triggs retaining the top floor. Triggs also owned the cruiser Sea Mist circa 1939-41 (possibly  which sank the Japanese midget submarine M-21 in the attack on Sydney Harbour in 1942, but there may have been two cruisers called  made by Lars Halvorsen Sons in 1937-39, hence the confusion).

From 1939 to 1946 Triggs owned the approximately  Kyalla Park sheep farm and horse stud near Orange, which had the first electrified sheep-shearing shed in Australia (built in about 1910 by the previous owners, the Stuart family, builders of Luna Park Sydney). Subsequently the property was slowly subdivided and sold off by the Dutton family, so that it was around  when owned by the Napier family from 1982 to 2021. In 1939 Triggs' racehorse Gilltown won the Moonee Valley Cup (and again in 1940) and City Tattersall's Gold Cup, and ran in the Melbourne Cup (leading almost to the home turn).

Ken Triggs
Kenneth Oliver Triggs OAM (1924–), the only son of Oliver Triggs, was a director and 25% shareholder in Meadow Lea from 1945 until the company's sale to Vegetable Oils Proprietary Limited in about 1956. He subsequently became a farmer and Chairman of the NSW Egg Board, a manufacturer of polystyrene containers, Chairman of Mutual Home Loans Fund of Australia Limited and Information Electronics Limited. In 2003 he became the Secretary of the Auburn sub-Branch of the Returned and Services League of Australia (RSL), and was made a life member of the RSL in 2008. He received an Order of Australia in 2011 for service to veterans and their families. He married Ruth Donnison in 1950 and they had two sons, David and Andrew. The couple divorced in about 1976, and in about 1985 Triggs married Lesley-Anne Woodward.

Meadow Lea house
The art deco heritage listed residential home named Meadow Lea at 22 Sydney Road, East Lindfield, Sydney, was built on four housing lots and completed in about 1941 for James Armstrong, at the time the sales manager of the Meadow Lea Margarine Company. It was sold in 1948 for £17,000 to Azzalin Romano, of the nightclub restaurant Romanos, who had sold his racehorse Bernborough in 1946 to Louis B. Mayer for £93,000. In 1955 the house was sold for £25,000. In 1996 it was purchased by Daniel Kalanderian, the co-founder of the large Sydney store, Victoria's Basement, who added a new wing and put it on the market in September 2010 for $7.5 million.

References

External links
Meadow Lea – official website
Goodman Fielder – Meadow Lea web page
Spread the Facts – website by Goodman Fielder
Kyalla Park – official website

Companies based in Sydney
Australian brands
New Zealand brands
Goodman Fielder brands
Australian condiments
Brand name condiments
Margarine brands
Dairy products companies of Australia
1932 establishments in Australia
Food and drink companies established in 1932
Products introduced in 1932
Australian  companies established in 1932